Rottach is a river of Bavaria, Germany. It flows into the Tegernsee, which is drained by the Mangfall, in Rottach-Egern.

See also
List of rivers of Bavaria

References

Rivers of Bavaria
Rivers of Germany